The visorbearers are hummingbirds in the bitypic genus Augastes in the family Trochilidae. 
The genus contains the following species:

References

 
Taxonomy articles created by Polbot